The South African Railways Class NG2 0-4-2ST of 1897 was a narrow-gauge steam locomotive from the pre-Union era in Transvaal.

Between 1897 and 1901, Arthur Koppel, acting as agent, imported a number of Dickson-built  narrow-gauge steam locomotives for mines on the Witwatersrand. In 1915, when an urgent need arose for additional locomotives in German South West Africa during the First World War, two of the  locomotives were purchased second-hand by the South African Railways, for use in that territory. They were later classified as Class NG2.

Manufacturer
Between 1897 and 1901, several narrow-gauge  steam locomotives, built by Dickson Manufacturing Company of Scranton in Pennsylvania shortly before it merged with seven other manufacturing firms to form the American Locomotive Company (ALCO) in 1901, were delivered to various gold mines on the Witwatersrand by Arthur Koppel, acting as importing agent.

Characteristics
The engines had bar frames, with the cylinders arranged outside the frames and actuated by Stephenson valve gear. Their saddle-tanks had a  water capacity.

First World War
In 1915, shortly after the outbreak of the First World War, the German South West Africa colony was occupied by the Union Defence Forces. Since a large part of the territory's railway infrastructure was destroyed or damaged by retreating German forces, an urgent need arose for locomotives for use on the narrow-gauge lines in that territory. The South African Railways (SAR) therefore bought two of these Dickson-built  locomotives second-hand, numbered them NG93 and NG94 and placed them in service in South West Africa (SWA).

Identity
The identity of these locomotives is difficult to prove, but the SAR diagram book for the Class NG2 gives dimensions which limit the possibilities to only three of the known Koppel imports. Two of these, Dickson works numbers 978 of 1897 and 1019 of 1898, had been delivered to the Lancaster Gold Mine in Roodepoort. That mine closed in June 1913 and the company was wound up in early 1915. It therefore seems a good probability that it were these two locomotives which the SAR bought for service in SWA.

A third locomotive with the same dimensions, for which no ownership history is known, was Dickson works no. 1102 of 1899. It is possible, but unproven, that this locomotive also went to Lancaster Gold Mine, since it was of identical dimensions to the other two.

Gauge
Although they were eventually classified as  locomotives along with the rest of the South African narrow-gauge locomotive fleet, they were actually constructed to  gauge.

Historically, the actual two-feet narrow-gauge rail spacing depended on whether or not the track was laid by a metricised country. German-built narrow-gauge lines in German South West Africa were therefore  gauge, while those in South Africa, built to Imperial standards, were  gauge. 

In practice, however, the two gauges are still being treated as one and the same by, for example, the British Military. The same applied in South Africa, as part of the British Commonwealth at the time. The  difference was considered as insignificant and narrow-gauge locomotives regularly migrated between the lines laid to German standards in SWA and those laid to Imperial standards in South Africa.

Service

The two locomotives remained in SWA after the war. In 1920, they were both reboilered by the SAR using boilers supplied by Henschel and Son, and in the process they lost their saddle tanks. Since this modification effectively converted them to tankless tank locomotives, they were equipped with timber-bodied two-axle tenders to carry their water and additional coal.

Classification
A system of grouping narrow-gauge locomotives into classes was only introduced on the SAR somewhere between 1928 and 1930. At that point, the two locomotives were designated Class NG2.

Disposal
The Class NG2 locomotives spent their last working years on the SAR working at the Usakos workshops in SWA, until they were withdrawn from service in 1936. Engine no. NG93 was sold to the Zebediela citrus estates in northern Transvaal in 1937, where it was finally withdrawn from service by 1943. Engine no. NG94 was sold to Igusi Timbers in Rhodesia and remained in service there until c. 1961.

References

2550
0-4-2ST locomotives
B1 locomotives
Dickson locomotives
600 mm gauge railway locomotives
Railway locomotives introduced in 1897
1897 in South Africa
Scrapped locomotives
Freight locomotives